Christian Smith-Solbakken is a Swedish DJ, record producer and remixer. In 1994, he founded Tronic Record Label, now one of the top 3 selling techno labels in the world according to Beatport. He is also the founder of Tronic Radio, a weekly show now syndicated to over 100 stations around the globe with their 200th show was celebrated with special guest Adam Beyer.

Although he was born in Stockholm, Christian spent much of his youth in Frankfurt, Germany, where his father was working as a pilot. In 1989 he moved to New York City and, 3 years later, to Washington D.C. where he started DJing in his spare time while studying at the local university.
He now lives in Mallorca.

References

Living people
Year of birth missing (living people)
Swedish DJs
Electronic dance music DJs